Pseudopezicula is a genus of fungi in the family Helotiaceae. Circumscribed by mycologist Richard Korf in 1986, the genus contains two species that cause angular leaf scorch disease on grapes.

References

Hypocreales genera
Helotiaceae
Taxa described in 1986